Kenneth Michael Schroy (born September 22, 1952 in Valley Forge, Pennsylvania) is a former American football safety who played eight seasons in the NFL for the New York Jets. 

Schroy played high school football at Quakertown Community Senior High School in Quakertown, scoring 27 touchdowns and rushing for 2,399 yards. He is currently the only player in Quakertown High School history to have his number (46) retired.

Schroy played college football at the University of Maryland and was drafted in 1975 by the Philadelphia Eagles (10th round, 248 overall), but never played for the team.

1952 births
Living people
People from Chester County, Pennsylvania
American football safeties
Players of American football from Pennsylvania
Maryland Terrapins football players
New York Jets players